Arif Haji oglu Babayev was an Azerbaijani film director and Honorary Art Worker of the Azerbaijan SSR (1964).

Biography
Arif Babayev was born on September 20, 1928, in Baku. The Babayevs family lived on Qala Street, in Ichari Shahar. Aa a child, Arif attended theatrical circles. His engagement in theatre led him to apply to study in a theatrical school. Until then he played walk-on parts in the plays “Malikmammad”, “Garaja giz” and “Ibrat”. In 1946, the Azerbaijan State Theatrical Institute was created on the basis of the theatrical school. Arif Babayev was admitted into the directing program and was taught by director and actor Mehdi Mammadov. Mehdi Mammadov entrusted Mayor's role from N.V.Gogol’s The Government Inspector to Arif Babayev. In 1953, Arif Babayev graduated from the institute and was placed to work at the Nakhchivan State Theater. In this theatre, he staged Gogol's play Marriage. He returned to Baku after some time and began working as a stage director at the Theater of Young Spectators.

On February 14, 1956, the first program went on air of the Azerbaijani Television. Arif Babayev was invited to work on television. In 1956, he shot his first documentary film Children of our City, marking the birth of television film in Azerbaijan. In 1959, he was appointed the chief director of the Azerbaijani Television. In these years, he shot a number of documentaries, staged television plays, such as Moabit Diaries by Musa Cälil, Blind Woman by Taras Shevchenko, Law by Rasul Rza, and The Morning by Mehdi Huseyn.

In 1964, he became the first television worker in Azerbaijan who was given the title of the Honorary Art Worker. He was invited to Azerbaijanfilm in the same year. In 1964, he debuted as a director with short the film Summit, the first one in the series Whom We Love More, based on original screenplay by Imran Gasimov.

Filmography
Arif Babayev has directed the following films:

References

1928 births
1983 deaths
Film people from Baku
Soviet film directors
Recipients of the Istiglal Order
Azerbaijani film directors
Azerbaijani television directors
Azerbaijan State University of Culture and Arts alumni
Honored Art Workers of the Azerbaijan SSR